Otina ovata is  a species of small, air-breathing sea snail or sea slug, a marine pulmonate gastropod mollusk in the superfamily Otinoidea.

Otina ovata is the only species in the genus Otina. Otina is the only genus in the family Otinidae.

This family was classified within the clade Eupulmonata, which was within the informal group Basommatophora, according to the Taxonomy of the Gastropoda (Bouchet & Rocroi, 2005).

Various authors have referred some North American fossil shells to "Otinidae", but they did not give a genus or species for these records.

Distribution
This species is not common.

It occurs on the coasts of the Northeastern Atlantic Ocean in Western and South-Western Europe:

 British Isles (South and West coasts): Great Britain and Ireland
 Belgium
 Northern France (Manche, Etretat and Atlantic coast)
 Spain
 Portugal
 Sardinia

The type locality is Devonshire, England.

Description 
The shell is very small. The shell has 1.5 whorls. The last whorl is inflated. The aperture is oval and very large, like in succineids, columellar and parietal sides of the margin thickened.

The width of the shell is 1.5–3 mm. The height of the shell is 2–5 mm.

The animal cannot withdraw entirely into the shell. Otina ovata has no tentacles.

Habitat
This species breathes air and thus it is found intertidally on rocky shores in such places as caves and rocky overhangs.

Otina ovata lives in intertidal zone on rocks, algae and balanoids. It is often found in empty bivalve shells and moist rock crevices.

References
This article incorporates public domain text from the reference

External links 
 photo of the shell of Otina ovata.
 photo of the shell of Otina ovata.
 distribution map

Otinidae
Gastropods described in 1827